Jemez Pueblo (/ˈhɛmɛz/;) is a census-designated place (CDP) in Sandoval County, New Mexico, United States. The population was 1,788 at the 2010 census. It is part of the Albuquerque Metropolitan Statistical Area.

The CDP is named after the pueblo at its center.

Geography
Jemez Pueblo is located at  (35.610435, -106.727509).

Demographics

It seems that a significant part of the Jemez Pueblo population originates from the surviving remnant of the Pecos Pueblo population who fled to Jemez Pueblo in 1838.

The Jemez speak a Kiowa–Tanoan language also known as Jemez or Towa.

As of the census of 2000, there were 1,953 people, 467 households, and 415 families residing in the CDP. The population density was 957.0 people per square mile (369.6/km2). There were 499 housing units at an average density of 244.5 per square mile (94.4/km2). The racial makeup of the CDP was 0.41% White, 99.13% Native American, 0.31% from other races, and 0.15% from two or more races. Hispanic or Latino of any race were 1.95% of the population.

There were 467 households, out of which 39.0% had children under the age of 18 living with them, 39.2% were married couples living together, 35.1% had a female householder with no husband present, and 11.1% were non-families. 9.9% of all households were made up of individuals, and 2.8% had someone living alone who was 65 years of age or older. The average household size was 4.18 and the average family size was 4.45.

In the CDP, the population was spread out, with 35.0% under the age of 18, 11.1% from 18 to 24, 28.8% from 25 to 44, 18.4% from 45 to 64, and 6.7% who were 65 years of age or older. The median age was 28 years. For every 100 females, there were 94.7 males. For every 100 females age 18 and over, there were 86.9 males.

The median income for a household in the CDP was $28,889, and the median income for a family was $30,880. Males had a median income of $20,964 versus $17,262 for females. The per capita income for the CDP was $8,045. About 27.2% of families and 25.5% of the population were below the poverty line, including 27.1% of those under age 18 and 34.6% of those age 65 or over.

Ethnobotany
They consider Carex sacred and use it in the kiva.

Jemez runners
As much as 70% of the 1,890 Jemez people were living on their reservation lands in the early 1970s. Though by then an increasing number were switching to wage-earning work rather than agriculture, the residents continued to raise chile peppers, corn, and wheat, to speak their native language, and to maintain customary practices.

Running, an old Jemez pastime and ceremonial activity, grew even more popular than it had been before World War II. Prior to the advent of television at Jemez, tales of running feats had been a major form of entertainment on winter nights. Races continued to hold their ceremonial place as the years passed, their purpose being to assist the movement of the sun and moon or to hasten the growth of crops, for example. At the same time, they became a popular secular sport. The year 1959 saw the first annual Jemez All-Indian Track and Field Meet, won by runners from Jemez seven times in the first ten years. A Jemez runner, Steve Gachupin, won the Pikes Peak Marathon six times, setting a record in 1968 by reaching the top in just 2 hours, 14 minutes, 56 seconds.

Education
It is within the Jemez Valley Public Schools school district.

Jemez Day School, a federal elementary school operated by the Bureau of Indian Education, is in Jemez Pueblo.

Notable people 
 Cliff Fragua, Jemez sculptor
James Madalena, former member of the New Mexico House of Representatives
N. Scott Momaday, novelist, short story writer, essayist and poet who won the Pulitzer Prize for Fiction 
 Benny Shendo, member of the New Mexico Senate
 Mary Ellen Toya, (1934–1990), artist
 Evelyn M. Vigil, artist

See also

 Pueblo People
 Jemez Historic Site- Formerly Jemez State Monument
 Jemez Springs, New Mexico
 Pueblo Revolt
 Jemez River
 National Register of Historic Places listings in Sandoval County, New Mexico

References

Further reading
 Sando, Joe S., Nee Hemish: A History of Jemez Pueblo, Clear Light Publishing (2008), trade paperback, 264 pages,

External links

 Pueblo of Jemez website
 Walatowa Visitor Center

Census-designated places in Sandoval County, New Mexico
Census-designated places in New Mexico
Albuquerque metropolitan area
Indigenous languages of the North American Southwest
Pueblo great houses
Native American tribes in New Mexico
National Register of Historic Places in Sandoval County, New Mexico
Pueblos on the National Register of Historic Places in New Mexico
Historic districts on the National Register of Historic Places in New Mexico